Damodar Khushaldas Botadkar was a Gujarati language poet of early 20th century.

Life
Botadkar was born in Botad on 27 November 1870. He had primary education and started teaching at age of thirteen. He tried multiple businesses but failed. In 1893, he went to Bombay with Vaishnav Pushtimarg saint and started editing their religious publication. He learned Sanskrit there and returned to home in 1907 due to health issues. He again started teaching in schools.

He died on 7 September 1924.

Works
Botadkar published a play titled Swayamvar Vidhithi Sukhi Dampati nu Natak. His earlier poem cillections include Gokulgeeta, Rasvarnan, Subodh Kavyasangraha. His Sanskrit-laden poetry collections Kallolini (1912), Srotsvini (1918), Nirjharini ( 1921) were followed by Ras-tarangini (1923),  the folk and traditional Rasa or Garba styled poetry with simple and traditional tunes and diction. It was chiefly focused on traditional family life and styles of females and social life of that time. They are termed as Rasa poems. His Shaivalini (1925) was published posthumously.

Further reading
 Biography:

See also
 List of Gujarati-language writers

References

External links
 

Gujarati-language writers
People from Botad district
20th-century Indian poets
1870 births
1924 deaths
Indian male poets
Poets from Gujarat
20th-century Indian male writers